Shecky Greene (born Fred Sheldon Greenfield; April 8, 1926) is an American comedian. He is known for his nightclub performances in Las Vegas, Nevada, where he became a headliner in the 1950s and '60s. He has appeared in several films, including Tony Rome; History of the World, Part I; and Splash. In television, he has guest-starred on such television shows as Love, American Style and Combat!, and later Laverne & Shirley and Mad About You.

Early life, family and education
Greene was born to Jewish parents, Carl and Bessie Greenfield, and raised on the North Side of Chicago, Illinois.

He enjoyed performing as a youth as a singer and drama club he formed while attending Sullivan High School. He emulated his older brother, who liked to speak in accents.

He served in the United States Navy during World War II for three years and was discharged in 1944. He was briefly—but more than once—enrolled at Wright Junior College.

Career
Greene had planned to become a gym teacher. But after regularly performing stand-up in Chicago at mob-run nightclubs and various venues in the upper Midwest, he instead started his comedy career at the Prevue Lounge in New Orleans, Louisiana, where he worked for six years. From there, he went on to showrooms in Miami, Chicago, and Reno/Lake Tahoe before an agent persuaded him to move to Las Vegas and open in 1954 for Dorothy Shay, "the Park Avenue Hillbillie", at the Last Frontier. His act was held over for 18 weeks, a first for that venue. He began performing at The Tropicana Hotel in 1957, remaining there for five years as one of their headliners.

Greene played Carnegie Hall and appeared on TV variety show The Ed Sullivan Show, which he says he hated because "They'd rush you on and off". He played Pvt. Braddock for a year on Combat! and guested on The Joey Bishop Show, The Love Boat, and played Lou Carnesco in two episodes of The Fall Guy. He appeared in "Members Only", a fourth-season, 1985 episode of the action TV show The A-Team. Greene was widely respected by his peers, including Johnny Carson who was a longtime fan. Greene made 40 appearances on The Tonight Show on which he also served as a guest host. He appeared on The Merv Griffin Show and also served as a guest host. He notes that he gave Arnold Schwarzenegger and Luciano Pavarotti their first national television exposure. He also appeared on Match Game and Tattletales (with his first wife Nalani Kele) in the 1970s.

When the MGM Grand Hotel opened in 1975 with Dean Martin as headliner, the second headline act was Shecky Greene whose salary at one point climbed to $150,000 a week and quipped that $125,000 went to "my bookmaker".

Greene claims Jay Leno once told him that his all-time favorite joke is one Greene recounted about Frank Sinatra (with whom Greene had a contentious relationship) "saving his life". Offended by a remark made by Greene, Sinatra sent five men to assault him; after some time, he heard Sinatra say, "OK, he's had enough."

Beginning in 2003, and lasting for six years, Greene suffered from panic attacks and stage fright that rendered him unable to perform. In 2009, in Las Vegas, Greene returned to performing.

Greene owned several nightclubs over the years and in different cities, including New Orleans.

Personal life
Offstage, Greene's main passion was Thoroughbred racing. A horse named Shecky Greene (1970–1984) was the 1973 American Champion Sprint Horse and the front-runner for nearly seven furlongs in the 1973 Kentucky Derby until Secretariat ran off with the race. As of 2016, Arlington Park in Arlington Heights, Illinois, outside Chicago still holds a Shecky Greene Handicap race.

Greene has been married two times. He was married to Nalani Kele from 1972 to 1982. She had a hugely successful nightclub act, "Nalani Kele Polynesian Revue," from the 1960s to the early 1970s. Since 1985, he has been married to Marie Musso, daughter of Vido Musso, a Las Vegas musician who played saxophone with Benny Goodman. He has resided in Beverly Hills, California; Palm Springs, California; Las Vegas, Nevada.

Greene's career had obstacles due to depression and bipolar disorder, stage fright, gambling, panic attacks and drug abuse and alcoholism.

Greene led "humanitarian efforts" to create St. Judes Ranch, a shelter for indigent and neglected children in Boulder City, Nevada.

Awards
 Las Vegas Entertainment Award — Best Lounge Entertainer
 Jimmy Durante Award — Best Comedian
 Las Vegas Academy of Variety and Cabaret Artists — Male Comedy Star

Select filmography

References

External links

1926 births
Living people
Columbia College Chicago alumni
Wilbur Wright College alumni
American male comedians
Jewish American male actors
United States Navy personnel of World War II
Jewish American male comedians
Jewish male comedians
20th-century American comedians
21st-century American comedians
American male film actors